This is a list of 222 species in the genus Cylindera, rounded-thorax tiger beetles.

Cylindera species

 Cylindera agnata (Fleutiaux, 1890) c g
 Cylindera agualusai Serrano & Capela, 2015 c g
 Cylindera albopunctata (Chaudoir, 1852) c g
 Cylindera albosignata (W. Horn, 1913) c g
 Cylindera ancistridia (Acciavatti & Pearson, 1989) c g
 Cylindera anelia (Acciavatti & Pearson, 1989) c g
 Cylindera antoni Cassola & Probst, 1996 c g
 Cylindera apiata (Dejean, 1825) c g
 Cylindera arenaria (Fuesslin, 1775) c g
 Cylindera armandi (Fairmaire, 1886) c g
 Cylindera aurosternalis (W. Horn, 1894) c g
 Cylindera belli (W. Horn, 1894) c g
 Cylindera belloides (W. Horn, 1907) c g
 Cylindera bigemina (Klug, 1834) c g
 Cylindera biprolongata (W. Horn, 1924) c g
 Cylindera bonina (Nakane & Kurosawa, 1959) c g
 Cylindera bouchardi (W. Horn, 1900) c g
 Cylindera brendelliana Naviaux, 1991 c g
 Cylindera brevis (W. Horn, 1905) c g
 Cylindera bryanti Cassola, 1983 c g
 Cylindera catoptroides (W. Horn, 1892) c g
 Cylindera celeripes (LeConte, 1846) i c g b  (swift tiger beetle)
 Cylindera centropunctata (Dejean, 1831) c g
 Cylindera chiliensis (Audouin & Brullé, 1839) c g
 Cylindera chubuti Cassola, 1999 c g
 Cylindera cinctipennis (LeConte, 1848)
 Cylindera cognata (Wiedemann, 1823) c g
 Cylindera collicia (Acciavatti & Pearson, 1989) c g
 Cylindera colmanti (W. Horn, 1899) c g
 Cylindera confluentesignata (W. Horn, 1915) c g
 Cylindera conicollis (Schaum, 1862) c g
 Cylindera constricticollis (W. Horn, 1913) c g
 Cylindera contorta (Fischer von Waldheim, 1828) c g
 Cylindera craspedota (Schaum, 1863) c g
 Cylindera cursitans (LeConte, 1856) i c g b  (ant-like tiger beetle)
 Cylindera cyclobregma (Acciavatti & Pearson, 1989) c g
 Cylindera cylindriformis (W. Horn, 1912) c g
 Cylindera davidis (Fairmaire, 1887) c g
 Cylindera dayaka Matalin, 2002 c g
 Cylindera debilis (Bates, 1890) i c g b  (grass-runner tiger beetle)
 Cylindera decellei Basilewsky, 1968 c g
 Cylindera decempunctata (Dejean, 1825) c g
 Cylindera decolorata (W. Horn, 1907) c g
 Cylindera delavayi (Fairmaire, 1886) c g
 Cylindera descendens (Fischer von Waldheim, 1825) c g
 Cylindera dieckmanni Cassola, 1983 c g
 Cylindera dilatotarsa (W. Horn, 1924) c g
 Cylindera discovelutinosa (W. Horn, 1931) c g
 Cylindera discreta (Schaum, 1863) c g
 Cylindera disjuncta (Dejean, 1825) c g
 Cylindera dissimilis (Péringuey, 1892) c g
 Cylindera dokhtourowi (Jakovlev, 1884) c g
 Cylindera dormeri (W. Horn, 1898) c g
 Cylindera drakei (W. Horn, 1892) c g
 Cylindera dregei (Mannerheim, 1837) c g
 Cylindera dromicoides (Chaudoir, 1852) c g
 Cylindera duffelsiana Cassola, 2006 c g
 Cylindera elegantissima (W. Horn, 1892) c g
 Cylindera elisae (Motschulsky, 1859) c g
 Cylindera eoa (W. Horn, 1898) c g
 Cylindera erudita (Wiedemann, 1823) c g
 Cylindera eugeni (Laporte, 1835) c g
 Cylindera excisa (Schaum, 1862) c g
 Cylindera fabiocassolai Wiesner, 1989 c g
 Cylindera fallaciosa (W. Horn, 1897) c g
 Cylindera fallax (Coquerel, 1851) c g
 Cylindera filigera (Bates, 1878) c g
 Cylindera foveolata (Schaum, 1863) c g
 Cylindera friedenreichi (Dokhtouroff, 1887) c g
 Cylindera froggatti (W.J. Macleay, 1887) c g
 Cylindera fuscopurpurea (Mandl, 1957) c g
 Cylindera ganglbaueri (W. Horn, 1892) c g
 Cylindera genieri Cassola & Werner, 2003 c g
 Cylindera genofiae Rivalier, 1973 c g
 Cylindera germanica (Linnaeus, 1758) c g
 Cylindera glabra (Bogenberger, 1988) c g
 Cylindera gormazi (Reed, 1871) c g
 Cylindera gracilis (Pallas, 1773) c g
 Cylindera grammophora (Chaudoir, 1852) c g
 Cylindera graniticollis Cassola, 1996 c g
 Cylindera granulipennis (Bates, 1874) c g
 Cylindera gulbenkiana A. Serrano, 2007 c g
 Cylindera hammondi Cassola, 1983 c g
 Cylindera hassenteufeli (Mandl, 1960)
 Cylindera henryi (W. Horn, 1925) c g
 Cylindera hirsutifrons (Sumlin, 1979)
 Cylindera hoegei (Bates, 1881) c g
 Cylindera holosericea (Fabricius, 1801) c g
 Cylindera humerula (W. Horn, 1905) c g
 Cylindera humillima (Gestro, 1893) c g
 Cylindera ibana (Bogenberger, 1984) c g
 Cylindera illecebrosa (Dokhtouroff, 1885) c g
 Cylindera ilonae Matalin, 2015 c g
 Cylindera inopinata Cassola, 1987 c g
 Cylindera inscripta (Zoubkoff, 1833) c g
 Cylindera iravaddica (Gestro, 1893) c g
 Cylindera jacobsoni (W. Horn, 1913) c g
 Cylindera jeanneli J.Moravec, 2008 c g
 Cylindera judy Cassola & Brzoska, 2013 c g
 Cylindera juergenwiesneri Naviaux, 1991 c g
 Cylindera kaleea (Bates, 1866) c g
 Cylindera karli Cassola, 2009 c g
 Cylindera kazantsevi Matalin, 2001 c g
 Cylindera khmer Cassola, 2005 c g
 Cylindera kibbyana Cassola, 1983 c g
 Cylindera kollari (Gistel, 1837) c g
 Cylindera kualatahanensis Matalin & Cassola, 2000 c g
 Cylindera labioaenea (W. Horn, 1892) c g
 Cylindera lacunosa (Putzeys, 1875) c g
 Cylindera lautissima (Dokhtouroff, 1888) c g
 Cylindera lemniscata (LeConte, 1854) i c g b  (white-striped tiger beetle)
 Cylindera lesnei (Babault, 1923) c g
 Cylindera limitisca (Acciavatti & Pearson, 1989) c g
 Cylindera litterifera (Chaudoir, 1842) c g
 Cylindera lizleri Werner, 1994 c g
 Cylindera lobipennis (Bates, 1888) c g
 Cylindera longipalpis (W. Horn, 1892) c g
 Cylindera lunalonga (Schaupp, 1884) i c g b  (meadow tiger beetle)
 Cylindera lutaria (Guerin-Meneville, 1849) c g
 Cylindera macilenta (Schaum, 1862) c g
 Cylindera macrodonta Cassola & Probst, 1995 c g
 Cylindera malaris (W. Horn, 1896) c g
 Cylindera mandibularis (Schaum, 1860) c g
 Cylindera marquardti (W. Horn, 1906) c g
 Cylindera marshallisculpta (W. Horn, 1913) c g
 Cylindera maxillaris (W. Horn, 1895) c g
 Cylindera melaleuca (Dejean, 1831) c g
 Cylindera melitops (Acciavatti & Pearson, 1989) c g
 Cylindera mesoepisternalis (W. Horn, 1933) c g
 Cylindera minuta (G.A.Olivier, 1790) c g
 Cylindera minutula (Guerin-Meneville, 1849) c g
 Cylindera mixtula (W. Horn, 1915) c g
 Cylindera modica (Gestro, 1893) c g
 Cylindera mongolica (Faldermann, 1835) c g
 Cylindera morio (Klug, 1834) c g
 Cylindera mourzinei Werner & Naviaux, 2004 c g
 Cylindera mouthiezi Dheurle, 2015 c g
 Cylindera murzinorum Naviaux, 2011 c g
 Cylindera mutata (Fleutiaux, 1893) c g
 Cylindera nahuelbutae Peña, 1957 c g
 Cylindera nana (Schaum, 1862) c g
 Cylindera nanula (W. Horn, 1937) c g
 Cylindera neervoorti (W. Horn, 1913) c g
 Cylindera nephelota (Bates, 1882) c g
 Cylindera nietneri (W. Horn, 1894) c g
 Cylindera nigrovittata (W. Horn, 1896) c g
 Cylindera nivea (Kirby, 1819) c g
 Cylindera nox (Semenov, 1897) c g
 Cylindera nudata (W. Horn, 1915) c g
 Cylindera obliquefasciata (M.Adams, 1817) c g
 Cylindera obsoletesignata (W. Horn, 1895) c g
 Cylindera ocellifera (W. Horn, 1905) c g
 Cylindera ochrocnemis (Acciavatti & Pearson, 1989) c g
 Cylindera octoguttata (Fabricius, 1787) c g
 Cylindera oesterlei Sawada & Wiesner, 2004 c g
 Cylindera ovipennis (Bates, 1883) c g
 Cylindera paeninsularis Naviaux, 1991 c g
 Cylindera paludosa (L.Dufour, 1820) c g
 Cylindera paradoxa (W. Horn, 1892) c g
 Cylindera patagonica (Brullé, 1837) c g
 Cylindera paucipilina (Acciavatti & Pearson, 1989) c g
 Cylindera perparva Cassola, 1983 c g
 Cylindera piligera (W. Horn, 1897) c g
 Cylindera plasoni (W. Horn, 1903) c g
 Cylindera praecisa (Bates, 1890) c g
 Cylindera procera (W. Horn, 1905) c g
 Cylindera pronotalis (W. Horn, 1922) c g
 Cylindera proserpina (W. Horn, 1904) c g
 Cylindera pseudocylindriformis (W. Horn, 1913) c g
 Cylindera pseudodeserticola (W. Horn, 1891) c g
 Cylindera pseudokibbyana Cassola, 2009 c g
 Cylindera pseudolongipalpis (W. Horn, 1930) c g
 Cylindera pseudonana (W. Horn, 1924) c g
 Cylindera psilica (Bates, 1866) c g
 Cylindera pygmaea (Dejean, 1825) c g
 Cylindera raffrayi Werner, 1993 c g
 Cylindera ramenensis J.Moravec, 2010 c g
 Cylindera ramosa (Brullé, 1837) c g
 Cylindera rara (Minowa, 1932) c g
 Cylindera rectangularis (Klug, 1832) c g
 Cylindera reductula (W. Horn, 1915) c g
 Cylindera rhytidopteroides (W. Horn, 1924) c g
 Cylindera ritsemai (W. Horn, 1895) c g
 Cylindera rothschildi (W. Horn, 1896) c g
 Cylindera sakalava Cassola & Andriamampianina, 1998 c g
 Cylindera salomonica Cassola, 1987 c g
 Cylindera sarawakensis Wiesner, 1996 c g
 Cylindera sauteri (W. Horn, 1912) c g
 Cylindera schaefferi (W. Horn, 1903) c g
 Cylindera seleiensis (Brouerius van Nidek, 1954) c g
 Cylindera semperi (W. Horn, 1893) c g
 Cylindera seriepunctata (W. Horn, 1892) c g
 Cylindera serranoi Werner, 1995 c g
 Cylindera severini (W. Horn, 1892) c g
 Cylindera shirakii (W. Horn, 1927) c g
 Cylindera siccalacicola (Sumlin, 1979) c g
 Cylindera sikhimensis (Mandl, 1982) c g
 Cylindera singalensis (W. Horn, 1911) c g
 Cylindera sinuosa (Brullé, 1837) c g
 Cylindera somnuki Naviaux, 1991 c g
 Cylindera soror (W. Horn, 1897) c g
 Cylindera spinolae (Gestro, 1889) c g
 Cylindera spinosa (W. Horn, 1905) c g
 Cylindera sublacerata (Solsky, 1874) c g
 Cylindera subtilesignata (Mandl, 1970) c g
 Cylindera suturalis (Fabricius, 1798) i c g
 Cylindera takahashii Cassola & Sato, 2004 c g
 Cylindera terricola (Say, 1824) i c g b  (variable tiger beetle)
 Cylindera trisignata (Dejean, 1822) c g
 Cylindera umbratilis (Fairmaire, 1903) c g
 Cylindera umbropolita (W. Horn, 1905) c g
 Cylindera unipunctata (Fabricius, 1775) i c g b  (one-spotted tiger beetle)
 Cylindera vandenberghei Dheurle, 2016 c g
 Cylindera venosa (Kollar, 1836) c g
 Cylindera versicolor (W.S. MacLeay, 1825) c g
 Cylindera viduata (Fabricius, 1801) c g
 Cylindera virgulifera Cassola, 1995 c g
 Cylindera viridilabris (Chaudoir, 1852) c g
 Cylindera viridisticta (Bates, 1881) i c g b  (pygmy tiger beetle)
 Cylindera waterhousei (W. Horn, 1900) c g
 Cylindera werneri Wiesner, 1988 c g
 Cylindera willeyi (W. Horn, 1904) c g
 Cylindera yaguaree Perger & Guerra, 2012 c g
 Cylindera zaza (Alluaud, 1902) c g
 Cylindera zischkai (Mandl, 1956) c g

Data sources: i = ITIS, c = Catalogue of Life, g = GBIF, b = Bugguide.net

References

Cylindera